Andrew O'Donnellan  was an Irish prelate who served as Bishop of Clonfert in the eighteenth century.

He was appointed coadjutor bishop of Clonfert on1 December 1776, succeeded on 7 May 1778 and died in 1786.

References

Roman Catholic bishops of Clonfert
18th-century Roman Catholic bishops in Ireland
1786 deaths
People from County Galway